The 1990–91 Yugoslav Second League season was the 45th season of the Second Federal League, the second level association football competition of SFR Yugoslavia, since its establishment in 1946.

Teams
A total of 19 teams contested the league, including fourteen sides from the 1989–90 season, one club relegated from the 1989–90 Yugoslav First League and four sides promoted from the Inter-Republic Leagues played in the 1989–90 season. The league was contested in a double round robin format, with each club playing every other club twice, for a total of 36 rounds. Two points were awarded for a win, while in case of a draw - penalty kicks were taken and the winner of the shootout was awarded one point while the loser got nothing.

Vardar were relegated from the 1989–90 Yugoslav First League after finishing in the 18th place of the league table. The four clubs promoted to the second level were Bor, Mogren, Radnički Belgrade and NK Zagreb.

League table
Two teams promoted. After the secession of Croatia, four clubs were selected by the Federation between different Republics.

See also
1990–91 Yugoslav First League
1990–91 Yugoslav Cup

References

Yugoslav Second League seasons
Yugo
2